Wiri is a mostly industrial-commercial focused suburb in Auckland, New Zealand. It was formerly part of Manukau City until the merger of all of Auckland's councils into the 'super city' in 2010. The area was named after  the chief Takaanini Wirihana.

The Wiri inland port connects road freight to the Ports of Auckland on the Waitemata Harbour further north. The inland port allows the Ports of Auckland to reduce the number of trucks that have to travel through the Auckland Central area by up to 100,000 trips per year.

Auckland Region Women's Corrections Facility (ARWCF) is located in Wiri. ARWCF is the first purpose-built women's prison in New Zealand to accommodate a growing number of female prisoners and services in the upper North Island. The facility can accommodate 286 prisoners and employs 167 staff.

The adjacent Auckland South Corrections Facility is a high security men's prison which opened in 2015. It is operated by Serco New Zealand under a Public Private Partnership with the Department of Corrections. at 20 Hautu Drive, Wiri.

As part of the Auckland railway electrification project, the $100 million EMU maintenance and stabling depot was built on 4.4 hectares of the old Winstone Quarry in Wiri, located next to the South-Western Motorway and bordered by Roscommon and Wiri Station Roads. It was officially opened by the Mayor of Auckland on 5 July 2013.

The Wiri railway station was opened from 1913 and closed in 2005 due to low patronage, the EMU maintenance facility was built on the former site.

The Matukutūruru (Wiri Mountain) and Matukutūreia (McLaughlins Mountain) volcanoes are in Wiri. Much of the land within the suburb of Wiri was formed through lava flows originating from these mountains.

Demographics

Wiri had a population of 5,355 at the 2018 New Zealand census, an increase of 1,434 people (36.6%) since the 2013 census, and an increase of 1,488 people (38.5%) since the 2006 census. There were 999 households, comprising 2,814 males and 2,544 females, giving a sex ratio of 1.11 males per female, with 1,311 people (24.5%) aged under 15 years, 1,410 (26.3%) aged 15 to 29, 2,145 (40.1%) aged 30 to 64, and 492 (9.2%) aged 65 or older.

Ethnicities were 20.4% European/Pākehā, 31.2% Māori, 47.2% Pacific peoples, 18.0% Asian, and 2.0% other ethnicities. People may identify with more than one ethnicity.

The percentage of people born overseas was 33.8, compared with 27.1% nationally.

Although some people chose not to answer the census's question about religious affiliation, 24.9% had no religion, 51.8% were Christian, 4.1% had Māori religious beliefs, 4.7% were Hindu, 3.2% were Muslim, 1.3% were Buddhist and 3.4% had other religions.

Of those at least 15 years old, 363 (9.0%) people had a bachelor's or higher degree, and 906 (22.4%) people had no formal qualifications. 177 people (4.4%) earned over $70,000 compared to 17.2% nationally. The employment status of those at least 15 was that 1,440 (35.6%) people were employed full-time, 387 (9.6%) were part-time, and 360 (8.9%) were unemployed.

Education

Both schools are coeducational.

References

External links
 Photographs of Wiri held in Auckland Libraries' heritage collections.

Suburbs of Auckland
Populated places around the Manukau Harbour